The 1879 Cambridgeshire by-election was fought on 30 January 1879.  The byelection was fought due to the death of the incumbent Conservative MP, Elliot Yorke.  It was won by the Conservative candidate Edward Hicks, who was unopposed.

References

1879 in England
1879 elections in the United Kingdom
By-elections to the Parliament of the United Kingdom in Cambridgeshire constituencies
19th century in Cambridgeshire
Unopposed by-elections to the Parliament of the United Kingdom in English constituencies